Ira Heiden (born September 22, 1966) is an American television and film actor. He played Will Stanton in the 1987 horror film A Nightmare on Elm Street 3: Dream Warriors. Ira's other film roles include the 1988 film Elvira: Mistress of the Dark, Timelock (1996), The Trouble with the Truth (2011), and Ghostbusters: Afterlife (2021).

Heiden had a small recurring role in the ABC hit TV series Alias as C.I.A. techie Rick McCarthy. He has made guest appearances on TV shows such as Family Ties, Step by Step, and Family Matters.

Filmography

External links
 

1966 births
American male film actors
American male television actors
American male voice actors
Living people
Male actors from New York City
20th-century American male actors
21st-century American male actors